Kate McKinnon Berthold (born January 6, 1984) is an American actress, comedian, writer, and singer. McKinnon is most notable for being a cast member on the NBC sketch comedy series Saturday Night Live from 2012 to 2022, where she became known for her character work and celebrity impressions. Prior to SNL, she also starred on the Logo sketch program The Big Gay Sketch Show from 2007 to 2010. She has appeared in films such as Balls Out (2014), Ghostbusters (2016), Office Christmas Party (2016), Rough Night (2017), The Spy Who Dumped Me (2018), Yesterday (2019), and Bombshell (2019). In 2022, she played the role of Tiger King subject Carole Baskin in the miniseries Joe vs. Carole.

McKinnon has been nominated for ten Primetime Emmy Awards, including one for Outstanding Original Music and Lyrics and nine for Outstanding Supporting Actress in a Comedy Series, winning in 2016 and 2017.

Early life
McKinnon was born and raised on Long Island in the town of Sea Cliff, New York, to Laura Campbell, a parent educator, and Michael Thomas Berthold, an architect. She has a younger sister, comedian Emily Lynne, with whom she has collaborated on the Audible series Heads Will Roll, as well as the digital series Notary Publix. Their father died when McKinnon was 18 years old.

As a child, McKinnon played several instruments. She started playing the piano when she was five years old, the cello at age 12, and taught herself how to play the guitar at 15.

McKinnon's knack for accents began when she was in fifth grade. She auditioned to be "the queen of reading week" and used an English accent. In an interview with Rolling Stone, she says, "I think the genesis of my entire life, probably, was the smiles I elicited doing this British accent. I've been chasing that dragon ever since."

She graduated from North Shore High School in 2002,  and from Columbia University in 2006 with a degree in theatre. There she co-founded a comedy group, Tea Party, that focused on musical improv comedy. At Columbia, she starred in three Varsity shows: V109 Dial D for Deadline, V110 Off-Broadway and V111 The Sound of Muses. Her cast and crewmates included future actors Jenny Slate and Grace Parra, directors Tze Chun and Greta Gerwig, and The Onion managing editor Peter Koechley. She was also a member of Prangstgrüp, a student comedy group which set up and recorded elaborate college pranks.

Career
In 2007, McKinnon joined the original cast of Logo TV's The Big Gay Sketch Show, where she was a cast member for all three seasons.

Since 2008, she has performed live sketch comedy regularly at the Upright Citizens Brigade Theatre in New York City. She has also worked as a voice-over actress, and has voiced characters for series such as The Venture Bros., Robotomy, and Ugly Americans. In 2009, McKinnon won a Logo NewNowNext Award for Best Rising Comic. She was nominated for an ECNY Emerging Comic Award in 2010. In 2014, she appeared in the Kennedy Center Honors as part of a tribute to Lily Tomlin. In 2016, she starred in the reboot Ghostbusters, alongside Melissa McCarthy, and fellow SNL cast members Kristen Wiig and Leslie Jones.

McKinnon has made appearances as a voice actress in series like The Simpsons (as Hettie in "Gal of Constant Sorrow") and Family Guy (as Karen / Heavy Flo in season 14, episode 6 "Peter's Sister", and additional voices in other episodes), and films such as Finding Dory, The Angry Birds Movie, Ferdinand and DC League of Super-Pets. McKinnon voiced Fiona Frizzle in The Magic School Bus Rides Again, a continuation of the Magic School Bus children's series, from 2017 to 2020. She also voiced Squeeks the Mouse in the PBS Kids series Nature Cat, alongside fellow SNL cast members Taran Killam and Bobby Moynihan since 2015.

Saturday Night Live
McKinnon joined the cast of Saturday Night Live as a featured player on April 7, 2012, following a March 28, 2012 report of her being hired. She was promoted to repertory status in season 39 in 2013.

In 2013, McKinnon was nominated for an Emmy Award for Best Supporting Actress, Comedy. McKinnon won the 2014 American Comedy Award for Best Supporting Actress, TV for her work on SNL. In 2014, she was nominated for an Emmy Award for Outstanding Supporting Actress in a Comedy Series, as well as for Outstanding Original Music and Lyrics along with four of her colleagues for the song "(Do It On My) Twin Bed". She was nominated for an Emmy for Outstanding Supporting Actress in a Comedy Series for the second time in 2015. She won the following year, becoming the first actor from SNL to win the award since Dana Carvey in 1993.

McKinnon began appearing as Hillary Clinton on the series leading up to the 2016 presidential election. The real Clinton appeared alongside her in a sketch during the show's season 41 premiere. McKinnon has said that her impression of Hillary Clinton comes from a deep admiration, and that she "unequivocally want[ed] her to win" the 2016 presidential election. On November 12, 2016, which was the first show after Clinton's loss in the election, she reprised the role to open the show with a solo performance of "Hallelujah" by Leonard Cohen, whose death was announced two days before her performance. After the election, McKinnon began to impersonate Kellyanne Conway alongside Alec Baldwin as Donald Trump. On February 11, 2017, she debuted her impression of Elizabeth Warren during Weekend Update and Jeff Sessions in the cold open.

McKinnon is known for her character work and celebrity impressions of pop singer Justin Bieber, comedian television host Ellen DeGeneres, and numerous political figures, including US Attorney General Jeff Sessions, Senator Lindsey Graham, Supreme Court Justice Ruth Bader Ginsburg, Clinton, Warren, Robert Mueller, Angela Merkel, and Rudy Giuliani. She has been nominated for seven Primetime Emmy Awards, including one for Outstanding Original Music and Lyrics and six for Outstanding Supporting Actress in a Comedy Series, winning in 2016 and 2017.

McKinnon's return to season 46 officially made her the show's longest tenured female cast member, surpassing her cast mates Cecily Strong and Aidy Bryant by five episodes. Both Bryant and McKinnon departed the series after season 47. Strong passed McKinnon's record with the December 17, 2022 episode of season 48.

Saturday Night Live characters

Olya Povlatsky, a Russian woman who voices her opinions on current events, comparing them to the outrageous struggles she faces in her village. She also appeared in a cold open with Beck Bennett as Vladimir Putin reading a prepared statement against her will.
Sheila Sovage, a heavily intoxicated woman at a bar who meets and hooks up with a heavily intoxicated man or woman, played by the host, at closing time.
 Jodi Cork, The Art of the Encounter and Women in the Workplace co-host with Donna Fingerneck (played by Cecily Strong).
 Barbara DeDrew, a lesbian volunteer at the cat shelter Whiskers R We.
 Deenie, a.k.a. "Somebody's Mom", a middle-aged woman who attempts to recap shows she's been watching, but only knows the characters by self-applied nicknames, such as "Big Boobs" and "Mustache". She is always eating some foul concoction out of Tupperware, such as Brussels sprouts and imitation crab, which generally both revolts and breaks up Weekend Update anchor Colin Jost. The character is based on longtime SNL writer Paula Pell's mother.
 Mrs. Santini, an apartment dweller who writes passive-aggressive notes to her neighbors. Originally performed as Effie Villalopolus on Comedy Bang! Bang!
 Colleen Rafferty, a 27-year-old woman (despite looking middle-aged, implicitly due to her repeated traumas) who appears in panels with two of her friends (played by Cecily Strong as a hippie named Sharon, alongside the episode's host). The three friends recount their experience of a shared paranormal event (such as being abducted by aliens, having a near-death experience, discovering that Santa Claus is real, being visited by ghosts, and discovering that time travel is possible). The other two friends always have an idyllic experience, while Rafferty instead goes through a different, traumatic experience during the event and invariably loses her pants.
 Les Dykawitz, a lesbian cop from the 1970s who works for Chicago PD along with her partner Chubina Fatzarelli (played by Aidy Bryant) in "Dyke & Fats".
Debette Goldry, a senile elderly actress whose harsh experiences with being an actress in old Hollywood (including the on-going issues of equal pay, sexual harassment and abuse, racial diversity in film roles, and actresses getting involved behind the camera as directors and writers) are more outrageous than what modern actresses have gone through.
 A member of Woodbridge High School's theatre troupe who make their performances obsessively and solely about social justice issues that they know very little about.
 Noelle LeSoup, the co-host of the French show "America's Funniest Cats" who appears on the American version of the show along with Joelle LaRue (played by Cecily Strong).
 Shud, a crass mermaid who is based on a blobfish, and makes sexual advances on an unfortunate marooned sailor.
 Dr. Wayne Wenowdis, a strangely accented middle-aged medical doctor, who debuted in 2020, as part of the Weekend Update segment with Colin Jost.
 Madame Vivelda, a fortune teller who predicts people's 2020 experiences.

Saturday Night Live impressions

Gillian Anderson
Julian Assange 
Iggy Azalea 
Joy Behar
Barbara Corcoran
Ingrid Bergman
Mary Berry
Justin Bieber
Mika Brzezinski
Theresa Caputo
Liz Cheney
Emilia Clarke
Hillary Clinton
Kellyanne Conway
Penelope Cruz
Ellen DeGeneres
Betsy DeVos 
Dido
Robert Durst
Elizabeth II
Anthony Fauci
Jodie Foster
Cecilia Giménez
Ruth Bader Ginsburg
Rudy Giuliani
Lindsey Graham
Savannah Guthrie
Bella Hadid
Laura Ingraham
Billie Jean King
Heidi Klum
Lisa Kudrow
Lorde
Lori Loughlin
Jane Lynch
Taylor Louderman
Theresa May
Frances McDormand
Angela Merkel
Nancy Pelosi 
Michelle Pfeiffer
Ann Romney
Wilbur Ross
Jeff Sessions
Shakira
Maggie Smith
Martha Stewart
Tilda Swinton
Ginni Thomas
Greta Thunberg
Keith Urban
Greta Van Susteren
Yolandi Visser
Nicolle Wallace
Elizabeth Warren
Debbie Wasserman Schultz
Janet Yellen

Work as a creator
Aside from SNL, McKinnon also co-created and co-stars in the web series Notary Publix with her sister Emily Lynne. In addition to Aidy Bryant (who stars in the series), McKinnon's SNL co-stars Beck Bennett, Jay Pharoah and SNL writer Paula Pell all guest-starred in the six-episode first season of the web series.

McKinnon and Lynne also created and released the fantasy-comedy Audible audio series Heads Will Roll, which premiered in May 2019. The show features guest appearances from Meryl Streep, Peter Dinklage, Audra McDonald, Bob the Drag Queen, Queer Eye's Fab Five, and Tim Gunn. Additionally, many of McKinnon's SNL co-stars are featured, including Aidy Bryant, Alex Moffat, Heidi Gardner and Chris Redd.

Other work
In 2015, McKinnon appeared in a number of commercials for the Ford Focus.

In 2016, McKinnon co-hosted the 31st Independent Spirit Awards with Kumail Nanjiani.

In 2019, she played a supporting role in the movie Yesterday.

Her absence from the first seven episodes of Saturday Night Lives 47th season was due to her filming the Peacock miniseries Joe vs. Carole, where she stars as Carole Baskin. It premiered March 3, 2022.

Personal life
McKinnon was in a relationship with photographer and actress Jackie Abbott. While presenting Ellen DeGeneres with the Carol Burnett Award at the 2020 Golden Globe Awards, McKinnon opened up about being a lesbian and thanked DeGeneres for making it less scary for her to accept her sexual orientation while watching her TV sitcom Ellen. While attending Columbia University, she dated future journalist Bari Weiss.

McKinnon has a cat, Nino Positano—named after a pizza restaurant where he was found—whom she jokingly refers to as her son. Nino appeared in a "Whiskers R We" sketch filmed from McKinnon's home in response to the COVID-19 pandemic, playing the role of all the cats up for adoption.

She does not have any social media accounts, fearing that she will "misrepresent [her] real feelings".

Filmography

Film

Television

Audio series

Awards and nominations

See also
 LGBT culture in New York City
 List of LGBT people from New York City
 Saturday Night Live parodies of Hillary Clinton

References

External links

 

1984 births
Living people
People from Sea Cliff, New York
Actresses from New York (state)
American film actresses
American impressionists (entertainers)
American sketch comedians
American television actresses
American voice actresses
American women comedians
Columbia College (New York) alumni
Comedians from New York (state)
Lesbian comedians
LGBT people from New York (state)
Outstanding Performance by a Supporting Actress in a Comedy Series Primetime Emmy Award winners
Upright Citizens Brigade Theater performers
21st-century American actresses
21st-century American comedians
21st-century American LGBT people
American lesbian actresses
American LGBT comedians